The girls' doubles of the tournament 2022 BWF World Junior Championships is an individual badminton tournament to crowned the best girls' doubles under 19 pair across the BWF associate members around the world. Players will compete to win the Eye Level Cup presented by the former BWF President and chairman of the World Youth Culture Foundation, Kang Young Joong. The tournament will be held from 24 to 30 October 2022 in the Palacio de Deportes de Santander, Spain. The defending champions are Lin Fangling and Zhou Xinru from China, but they were not eligible to participate this year.

Seeds

  Meilysa Trias Puspita Sari / Rachel Allessya Rose (final)
  Nikol Carulla / Lucía Rodríguez (second round)
  Lisa Curtin / Estelle van Leeuwen (fourth round)
  Malya Hoareau / Camille Pognante (quarter-finals)
  Lucie Amiguet / Vera Appenzeller (third round)
  Anisanaya Kamila / Az Zahra Ditya Ramadhani (fourth round)
  Émilie Drouin / Téa Margueritte (fourth round)
  Lucie Krulová / Petra Maixnerová (third round)

  Fernanda Munar / Rafaela Munar (second round)
  Mihaela Chepisheva / Tsvetina Popivanova (second round)
  Julia Meyer / Cara Siebrecht (fourth round)
  Kirsten de Wit / Meerte Loos (second round)
  Kateřina Koliášová / Kateřina Osladilová (third round)
  Madalena Fortunato / Beatriz Roberto (second round)
  Rui Kiyama / Kanano Muroya (semi-finals)
  Arlya Nabila Thesa Munggaran / Agnia Sri Rahayu (fourth round)

Draw

Finals

Top half

Section 1

Section 2

Section 3

Section 4

Bottom half

Section 5

Section 6

Section 7

Section 8

References

External links 
Draw

2022 BWF World Junior Championships